Lyme Regis railway station was the terminus of the Lyme Regis branch line in the west of the English county of Dorset. Serving the coastal resort town of Lyme Regis, it was sited high above the town centre as a result of the hilly nature of the local area. The line straddled the county boundary so that although the terminus was in Dorset most of the line lay in the neighbouring county of Devon.

History

Opened under the Light Railways Act 1896, it was operated from the start by the London and South Western Railway. The line then passed on to the Southern Railway in 1923 and the Southern Region of British Railways on nationalisation in 1948. It was then transferred to the Western Region in 1963, but the station and branch line were closed by the British Railways Board in November 1965.

Buildings

A small wooden building served the single platform. The station also had a signal box and engine shed, and a small goods shed.

The station closed with the branch in 1965.

The site today

The former site is now a small industrial estate. The station building was moved to Alresford on the Watercress Line, a heritage line in nearby Hampshire.

References 

 
 
 Lyme Regis station on navigable 1946 O. S. map
Lyme Regis station on Sub Brit

Disused railway stations in Dorset
Former London and South Western Railway stations
Railway stations in Great Britain opened in 1903
Railway stations in Great Britain closed in 1965
Beeching closures in England
Lyme Regis